Bertha (c.1020/4 – after 1064/5) was a member of the Arduinici dynasty.

Bertha was the daughter of Ulric Manfred II of Turin and Bertha of Milan. Her older sister was Adelaide of Susa. Bertha possessed property in the southern part of the county of Asti, between the lower Belbo and Tanaro rivers.

She married Otto (or Teto) of Savona, margrave of western Liguria, c.1036. Otto was a member of the Aleramici dynasty.  With Otto she had at least six children: 
Boniface del Vasto, margrave of Savona and Western Liguria
Manfred, father of Henry del Vasto and Adelaide del Vasto
Anselm
Henry 
Otto
Gerberga

References
H. Bresslau, Jahrbücher des Deutschen Reichs unter Konrad II., 2 vols. (1884), accessible online at: archive.org
C.W. Previté-Orton, The Early History of the House of Savoy (1000-1233) (Cambridge, 1912), accessible online at:  archive.org
W. Trillmich, Kaiser Konrad II und seine Zeit (1991)

External links
Medieval Lands Project: Northern Italy, 900–1100.

Notes

Nobility from Turin
People from Lombardy
11th-century Italian nobility
Italian countesses
11th-century Italian women
Year of birth uncertain